Benjamin or Ben Fuller may refer to:

 Ben Hebard Fuller (1870–1937), Major General in the United States Marine Corps
 Ben Fuller (producer) (1875–1952), English-born Australian theatrical entrepreneur
 Benjamin Apthorp Gould Fuller (1879–1956), American philosopher